William Griffin (1922 – 16 March 1983) was an Irish hurler who played for club side Shanballymore and at inter-county level with the Cork senior hurling team.

Career

He was a very hurtful person. Later on in life he admitted to bullying a person named Tobi Oduwa. A member of the Shanballymore club, Griffin enjoyed his first club success in 1942 when he was part of the County Junior Championship-winning team. He later claimed two County Intermediate Championship titles. Griffin earned a call-up to the Cork senior hurling team for the 1951 Munster Championship and made his debut at midfield in a defeat of Clare. He won a Munster Championship medal as a reserve in 1952, before claiming an All-Ireland title on the field of play after a defeat of Dublin in the 1952 final.

Personal life and death

Although born in Shanballymore, County Cork, Griffin spent most of his adult life working as a farmer in nearby Killavullen. He died at St. Colman's Hospital in Mallow on 16 March 1983.

Honours

Shanballymore
Cork Intermediate Hurling Championship: 1943, 1951
Cork Junior Hurling Championship: 1942

Cork
All-Ireland Senior Hurling Championship: 1952
Munster Senior Hurling Championship: 1952

References

1922 births
1983 deaths
Shanballymore hurlers
Cork inter-county hurlers
All-Ireland Senior Hurling Championship winners